Social BI, or Social Business Intelligence, refers to the creation, publishing and sharing of custom business analytics reports and dashboards by end users of Cloud technologies.

Social or collaborative BI is the use of Enterprise 2.0 tools and practices with business intelligence outputs for the purpose of making collective decisions. First enabled by the rapid growth of social media networks in 2009, Social BI allows for the collaborative development of post user-generated analytics among business analysts and data mining professionals.  This has removed previous barriers to self-service BI while still employing traditional analytics applications.

Social BI can also be interpreted as providing business intelligence based on social networks data. For example, a company selling consumer electronics goods needs to know how people are responding to their latest advertisements or promotions. The reports and visualizations made using social media represent what people are talking about in real time. Pulling data from different social media and preparing understandable reports will help company to decide upon further steps. These dashboards, visualizations, reports based on social media will be of help for companies to get efficient feedback and act accordingly.

History
On September 13, 2011, Dachis Group introduced the Social Business Index to provide some insights into how ‘social’ companies are, and how they stack up against similar corporations in their respective industries and their competitors, and provide some ‘social business’ benchmarks by company, subsidiary, geography, department and brand.

See also

 Analytic applications
 Artificial intelligence marketing
 Business Intelligence 2.0
 Business process discovery
 Business process management
 Business activity monitoring
 Business service management
 Customer dynamics
 Data Presentation Architecture
 Data visualization
 Decision engineering
 Enterprise planning systems
 Integrated business planning
 Location intelligence
 Operational intelligence
 Runtime intelligence
 Sales intelligence

References

Cloud applications
Business intelligence